Magnus Bahne (born 15 March 1979 in Kaarina) is a retired Finnish footballer goalkeeper.

Club career

Bahne started his career in FC Inter Turku and at the age 20 he became the number one goalkeeper of the team. In 2007, he signed with Halmstads BK in the Swedish Allsvenskan.
He has been on trial at Charlton in 2001, Fredrikstad FK in 2005 and IK Start in 2006.

When transferring in 2007 to Halmstads BK he immediately took the position as number one goalkeeper and one of the best goalkeepers in the league.

During the 2007 season, he injured himself against IFK Göteborg (1–3) in August. It was later revealed that he had torn his ACL and would not be able to play until after Euro 2008. Even though he missed a large part of the 2007 season due to the injury he was voted  goalkeeper of the year (best in Sweden) in the annual Fotbollsgala 2007. He made a successful comeback from the injury in the summer of 2008, playing 19 matches and gaining back the position has number one in Halmstad. In 2009, he played 27 matches in Allsvenskan.

On 1 September 2009 Bahne announced that he would not sign a new contract with Halmstads BK and that he would leave the club after the season, stating that he wanted to try to play in a bigger league.

On 30 January 2010 Assyriska FF confirmed that they have signed Bahne.

After only one season with Assyriska, Bahne signed a one-year contract with his former club FC Inter Turku on 8 November 2010.

International career

He is one of the candidates to take the place has number one goalkeeper in the Finnish national team, after Jussi Jääskeläinen announced about his retirement from the national team and concentrating fully on Bolton and the Premier League.

Magnus Bahne has made two appearances for Finland, he has also played 7 games for the Under-21 team.

Family

Magnus has a brother by the name Martin Bahne who is, in Finland, a well-known actor, who in 2007 played the main role in the movie Raja 1918 (English: The border 1918).

References

External links
 Svenskafans.com (Swedish)

1979 births
People from Kaarina
Living people
Finnish footballers
Finland under-21 international footballers
Finland international footballers
Association football goalkeepers
Finnish expatriate footballers
Veikkausliiga players
Allsvenskan players
Superettan players
Expatriate footballers in Sweden
Halmstads BK players
FC Inter Turku players
Assyriska FF players
Sportspeople from Southwest Finland